Kefeng Liu (Chinese: 刘克峰; born 12 December 1965), is a Chinese-American mathematician who is known for his contributions to geometric analysis, particularly the geometry, topology and analysis of moduli spaces of Riemann surfaces and Calabi–Yau manifolds. He is a professor of mathematics at University of California, Los Angeles, as well as the executive director of the Center of Mathematical Sciences at Zhejiang University. He is best known for his collaboration with Bong Lian and Shing-Tung Yau in which they establish some enumerative geometry conjectures motivated by mirror symmetry.

Biography
Liu was born in Kaifeng, Henan province, China. In 1985, Liu received his B.A. in mathematics from the Department of Mathematics of Peking University in Beijing. In 1988, Liu obtained his M.A. from the Institute of Mathematics of the Chinese Academy of Sciences (CAS) in Beijing. Liu then went to study in the United States, obtaining a Ph.D. from Harvard University in 1993 under Shing-Tung Yau.

From 1993 to 1996, Liu was C. L. E. Moore Instructor at the Massachusetts Institute of Technology. From 1996 to 2000, Liu was an assistant professor at Stanford University. Liu joined the University of California, Los Angeles faculty in 2000, where he was promoted to full professor in 2002. In September 2003, Liu was appointed as the head of Zhejiang University's mathematics department. Liu is currently the executive director of the Center of Mathematical Sciences at Zhejiang University.

Awards and honors
 Frederick E. Terman Fellow (1997-2001)
 Sloan Fellowship (1998-2001)
 Guggenheim Fellow (2002)
 Silver Morningside Medal (1998)
 Morningside Gold Medal in Mathematics (2004) 
 invited speaker, 2002 International Congress of Mathematicians

Editorial Work
 Communications in Analysis and Geometry, Editor-in-Chief
 Pure and Applied Mathematical Quarterly, Co-Editor-in-Chief.
 Asian Journal of Mathematics, Editor.
 Pacific Journal of Mathematics, Editor.
 Notices of the International Congress of Chinese Mathematicians, Co-Editor-in-Chief.
 Advanced Lectures in Mathematics, Executive Editor.
 Science China Mathematics, Editor.
 Mathematics and Humanities, Co-Editor-in-Chief.

References

External links
 Homepage of Kefeng Liu at UCLA
 Homepage of Kefeng Liu at ZJU 
 "A brief summary of my researches" by Kefeng Liu
 The Mathematics Genealogy Project – Kefeng Liu
 Knowledge, Technique, and Imagination – Kefeng Liu Hangzhou, April 2004

1965 births
Living people
20th-century American mathematicians
21st-century American mathematicians
American science writers
Chinese science writers
Educators from Henan
Harvard University alumni
Massachusetts Institute of Technology School of Science faculty
Mathematicians from Henan
Peking University alumni
People's Republic of China emigrants to the United States
Sloan Research Fellows
University of California, Los Angeles faculty
Writers from Kaifeng
Academic staff of Zhejiang University